The 2021 Conference USA baseball tournament was held from May 26 through 30 at J. C. Love Field at Pat Patterson Park in Ruston, Louisiana. The annual tournament determines the tournament champion of Division I Conference USA in college baseball. The tournament champion will then earn the conference's automatic bid to the 2021 NCAA Division I baseball tournament.

The tournament has been held every year since 1996, except for 2020, due to the COVID-19 pandemic. The Rice Owls has claimed seven championships, the most of any school, with the Owls latest win in 2017. This was the tournaments first appearance at J. C. Love Field.

Format and seeding
The tournament will consist the top eight teams in regular season play. The top three teams in each division will receive automatic bid, plus two teams with the best winning percentage regardless of division will receive at-large bids. The format will consist of two double-elimination brackets, with a single-elimination championship game.

As of May 16, 2021
x – Clinched C-USA tournament berth
y – Clinched division title

 For the first time since joining Conference USA in 2005, Rice did not qualify for this season's conference tournament. The Owls break their 14-year streak. Southern Miss currently holds the most appearances at 25. The Golden Eagles have appeared in every tournament since the creation of the tournament in 1996.

Bracket and results

Schedule

Notes

Conference championship

All–Tournament Team

Tournament site
In June 2020, Louisiana Tech University won the bid to host the tournament on their campus for the first time since joining the conference. This will also be the first campus site for the tournament since 2016, as since then the games were played at MGM Park in Biloxi, Mississippi. The tournament returns to the state of Louisiana for the first time since the 2008 tournament, where it was played in New Orleans.

Pat Patterson Park, is a newly reconstructed stadium that opened for the 2021 season. The former stadium, along with other sports facilities was destroyed in 2019 by a F3 tornado.

References

Tournament
Conference USA Baseball Tournament
Conference USA baseball tournament
Conference USA baseball tournament
College baseball tournaments in Louisiana
Sports in Ruston, Louisiana